Junoniini is a tribe of nymphalid (brush-footed) butterflies.

Genera 
 Junonia Hübner, 1819 – buckeyes, commodores, pansies
 Precis Hübner, 1819 – pansies
 Protogoniomorpha Wallengren, 1857 (formerly in Salamis)
 Salamis Boisduval, 1833 – mother-of-pearls
 Yoma Doherty, 1886

Some classifications place the eggflies and diadems (Hypolimnas) here, others in the Kallimini.

References

 
Taxa named by Enzio Reuter
Butterfly tribes